Mother and Children (also known as La Promenade) is an Impressionist painting by Pierre-Auguste Renoir that is housed in the Frick Collection. Although the painting is most commonly known as Mother and Children, Renoir presented it with the title La Promenade in 1876. The painting is displayed in an alcove under a set of stairs at the Frick.

References

Bibliography

Paintings by Pierre-Auguste Renoir
1876 paintings
Paintings in the Frick Collection
Portraits of women
Paintings of children